The 2013 St. Louis Cardinals season was the 132nd for the baseball team in St. Louis, Missouri, the 122nd season in the National League (NL), and the eighth at Busch Stadium III.  On Opening Day, April 1, the St. Louis Cardinals played the 20,000th game in franchise history against the Arizona Diamondbacks, dating back to the start of their American Association (AA) play in 1882.  Heading into the 2013 season, St. Louis had an all-time winning percentage of .518.

Early in the season, the Cardinals navigated around the loss of key players Chris Carpenter, Jason Motte, Rafael Furcal and Jaime García due to season-ending injuries.  To offset these depletions, the St. Louis tapped heavily into their farm system.  In a May game against the Colorado Rockies, rookie starting pitcher Shelby Miller set an all-time franchise record for a nine-inning game score of 98.  Starter Adam Wainwright accumulated a franchise-record  innings (IP) before issuing his first walk on April 23 and earned NL Pitcher of the Month honors in June.  First baseman Allen Craig produced the third-highest individual batting average with runners in scoring position at .454 as the Cardinals set an all-time Major League team record at .330.  Rookie Matt Adams led the team in slugging percentage at .503.  Second baseman Matt Carpenter, playing his first season at the position since turning professional, earned an All-Star selection as he led the Major Leagues in hits (199), runs scored (126), and doubles (55).  In all, 20 rookies appeared in a game and the Cardinals collected 36 victories from their rookie pitchers.  The 2013 edition set franchise records in fielding percentage (.988), pitching strikeouts (1254) and strikeouts per 9 innings pitched (7.73).

Holding off fierce competition from the Cincinnati Reds and Pittsburgh Pirates, the Cardinals clinched the division crown as each team won at least 90 games.  The Cardinals finished the season with an NL-best 97–65 won–loss record.  They opened the playoffs by defeating the Pirates in five games in the NL Division Series (NLDS).  Advancing to their third straight National League Championship Series, they defeated the Los Angeles Dodgers in six games for their 19th NL pennant.  Rookie Michael Wacha, who had nearly no-hit the Washington Nationals late in September, continued his dominance throughout the postseason as he allowed no runs against the Dodgers in 13 IP, earning the NLCS MVP.  It was the second straight NLCS appearance to which manager Mike Matheny guided the Cardinals, who became the first manager to appear in an LCS in his first two seasons.  Rookie closer Trevor Rosenthal extended a 20-inning postseason scoreless streak that started in the 2012 NLDS.  The Cardinals met the Boston Red Sox in the World Series, only to lose the series in six games.

Offseason acquisitions, departures and roster moves

Management and coaches
 October 25, 2012:  Offered and retained all club coaches except bullpen coach Dyar Miller; no reason was cited.
 November 2, 2012:  Hitting coach Mark McGwire declined a contract extension.
 November 5, 2012:  Promoted assistant hitting coach John Mabry to hitting coach.
 November 5, 2012:  Promoted AAA pitching coach Blaise Ilsley to major league bullpen coach.
 December 14, 2012:  Hired Bengie Molina (Yadier's older brother) as assistant hitting coach.
 February 14:  Extended GM John Mozeliak's contract by three years to end after the 2016 season. Record as Cardinals' GM: 439–371 (.542).
 February 14:  Accepted manager Mike Matheny's 2014 option.

Hitters
 December 12, 2012:  Traded second baseman Skip Schumaker to the Los Angeles Dodgers for minor league shortstop Jake Lemmerman.
 December 14, 2012:  Signed infielder Ty Wigginton to a two-year contract worth $5 million.
 January 5:  Free agent RF/1B Lance Berkman signed a one-year, $10 million contract with the Texas Rangers.
 January 28:  Signed free agent shortstop Ronny Cedeño to a one-year deal worth $1.15 million.
 March 7:  Placed shortstop Rafael Furcal on the 15-day disabled list for a torn ligament, who was unavailable for the season as underwent Tommy John surgery.
 March 8:  Signed first baseman Allen Craig to a five-year contract worth $31 million, including a $13 million club option for 2018 and $1 million buyout.
 March 19:  Released Cedeño, leaving the club responsible for 45 days or one-fourth of the original salary ($282,787).

Pitchers
 October 30, 2012:  Added right-hander Jorge Rondon to the 40-man roster when Lohse and Berkman were removed as free agents.
 November 9, 2012:  Advanced Kyle Lohse an initial qualifying offer of $13.3 million, but he declined it to become a free agent.  He signed with the Milwaukee Brewers on March 25.  Under the terms of the current collective bargaining agreement, the Cardinals received a compensatory pick (#28) in the following June draft.
 November 13, 2012:  Granted Kyle McClellan an unconditional release.
 December 7, 2012:  Signed left-handed specialist Randy Choate to a three-year, $7.5 million contract.
 January 28:  Designated reliever Barret Browning for assignment when shortstop Cedeno was added to the 40-man roster.
 February 22:  Placed right-hander Chris Carpenter on the 60-day disabled list due to persisting numbness and weakness in his pitching arm.
 March 27:  Signed Adam Wainwright to a five-year extension for 2014–2018 worth $97.5 million.

Other offseason events
On February 5, the Cardinals announced that Chris Carpenter was unlikely to pitch this season as he continued to experience weakness and numbness in his pitching shoulder and arm.  He ceased throwing exercises and commented that he does not desire further surgery. Despite pitching just six full seasons with the team, he is likely assured a place in Cardinals' team history.

Less than a week later, Carpenter announced he would not travel to the club's spring training site in Jupiter, Florida and instead remain in St. Louis, fearing he could be a distraction. At a press conference that same day, he said he still holds out hope of pitching in 2013, and refused to talk about retirement. On February 22, the team placed Carpenter on the 60-day disabled list.

Spring training
Schedule and media. The club announced its 32-game spring schedule on November 30, 2012.  The first game was February 23, and the last on March 29.  Twelve games were nationally televised either on Fox Sports Midwest (10) or ESPN (2), starting on Monday March 11, 12:05pm (CT) at New York Yankees, through Thursday March 28 against the Miami Marlins.   (see also:National Broadcast Schedule)

Classic Cardinals.  Four Cardinals major leaguers participated in the World Baseball Classic tournament.  Yadier Molina and Carlos Beltrán both represented the nation of Puerto Rico, who finished runner-up for the entire tournament.  Relief pitchers Mitch Boggs pitched for the United States, Fernando Salas pitched for Mexico and minor leaguer Richard Castillo also pitched for Spain.

Martínez returns to the US. Long held over by visa problems in his native Dominican Republic, Carlos Martínez was finally granted reentry into the United States in the last week of March, and joined the minor league camp in Jupiter, Florida.  With camp ending on April 1, he started more than six weeks past the pitchers' report date in mid-February.  The #3 prospect in the Cardinals' system ended the 2012 season in Double-A (Springfield), where he posted a 2.90 ERA and held opponents to a .237 batting average in 15 games (14 starts).

Final spring training results. The Cardinals finished spring training on March 29 with a 16–15–1 record, and recorded 98,686 total attendance in 16 home games for an average of 6,168.  They had a .282 team batting average with an NL-leading 4.20 team ERA.  Last year, the team had a 16–9–2 record in spring training games with a .276 team batting average and 3.05 team pitching ERA, finishing 11th in the Grapefruit League.  They drew 85,858 fans during 13 home games, averaging 6,604 fans per game.

Openings
Middle infield. With shortstop Rafael Furcal's elbow (strained ulnar collateral ligament) cutting short his 2012 season, rest was thought to be the best option rather than surgery.  However, Furcal was shut down for the season on March 3 due to the ligament not improving, and an announcement for Tommy John surgery followed on March 7.

Free-agent signee Ronny Cedeño was brought in to back up second and shortstop after Skip Schumaker's trade, but was released on March 19,.  After an 18-inning tryout and an .828 OPS in 340 PAs as a rookie in 2012, utility player Matt Carpenter was advised to continue working out at second in the offseason, and was nominated for the regular job after spring.  Pete Kozma became the starting shortstop and Daniel Descalso the backup to Carpenter and Kozma.

Starting pitching. With Chris Carpenter shifted to the 60-day disabled list, one spot for a starting pitcher opened.  Competition fell between Joe Kelly and Shelby Miller.  Miller won the spot, sporting an 11:5 strikeout to walk ratio and 17 hits in 16 innings, compared to Kelly's 2:6 and 15 hits in 13 innings, placing him in a bullpen role.  Starter Lance Lynn reported to camp forty pounds lighter than in 2012, but ironically struggled to find his command as he attempted to pitch using a "new body."

Reserve roles.  Thanks to a strong spring at the plate, former Cardinals Minor League Player of the Year Matt Adams made the team as a pinch-hitter and backup at first base.  Rookie outfielder Óscar Taveras also made a strong impression, batting .289 with two home runs and 10 RBIs in 80 PAs.  He started the season in the minors to allow "his development ... to be playing every day ... to handle the day-to-day rigors of the major league schedule", according to Mozeliak.

Injuries
Matheny underwent successful back surgery on March 11 to relieve pain and numbness caused by a ruptured disk.

On March 21, closer Jason Motte experienced tightness in his pitching elbow after pitching against the Mets.  An MRI revealed a right flexor tendon strain.  He began the season on the DL and Mozeliak was uncertain how much time he would miss.  Mitch Boggs replaced Motte as closer until his return.  On March 22, third baseman David Freese experienced back pain and was placed on the 15-day disabled list.

Regular season

April
The salary for the players for the season comes to $116.8 mil. (Google spreadsheet), a 4.4% increase over the $111.9 mil. in 2012.(Opening Day salaries)

Opening day on April 8 showed the largest attendance in the history of Busch Stadium with 47,345. The Cardinals had a 4–2 lead after 6 inn. and a 4–3 lead after 7 inn., but the Reds scored a run in the 8th to tie it, and then scored 9 in the 9th to win going away, 13–4. It spoiled a fine performance by starter Jaime García who pitched effectively for 6.2 inn., giving up 6 hits, 3 runs, walking 3, and striking out 10. It was the first of 19 games between the two teams the experts believe are the best in the Central, and will battle it out for the title.

The team chartered an overall successful opening month, finishing with a 15–11 record (.577 winning percentage) and in first place in the NL Central.  However, it was not without challenges: the rest of the division played also very competitively, with the Milwaukee Brewers, the Pittsburgh Pirates and the Cincinnati Reds each finished the month within one game of the Cardinals.  An outstanding effort by the starting pitching won all 15 games in the month (2.15 ERA in 167 innings, and 1.152 WHIP with 8.2 SO per nine innings) and timely hitting (.350 BA, .940 OPS with RISP) covered for an otherwise dismal offense (.245 BA, 20 home runs and .677 OPS) and dysfunctional bullpen (0–5, 5.82 ERA in 66 innings).  Starting pitcher Adam Wainwright began the season with 34 2/3 consecutive innings without issuing a walk, the longest such streak in team history since 1913, when Slim Sallee began the season with 40 consecutive innings (the team record). Wainwright led the league with 171 batters faced and in pitching 44 1/3 innings. Wainwright and Lance Lynn tied for the NL lead with four wins each, while Jake Westbrook led the league with a 0.98 ERA. Rookie Shelby Miller finished the month with a 2.05 ERA, 1.011 WHIP and 9.7 strikeouts per nine innings.

The team was only 6–5 at home, 9–6 on the road. They scored 117 runs, giving up 93.

May
Westbrook milestone.  Jake Westbrook won his 100th game (against 96 losses) on May 2 after two previous attempts in which the game was lost after he left the game in the lead. His 1.07 ERA and a 351 ERA+ lead the league, spearheading a trend in common with the Cardinals rotation.  To this point, the starters' aggregate 2.09 ERA led the majors and their 17–6 record led the NL, second in MLB only to the Boston Red Sox (17–4).  Adam Wainwright's 2.03 ERA was eighth in the NL, and Shelby Miller's 2.05 ERA tenth.  At 17–11, St. Louis' pitching staff had the second-lowest team ERA in the majors at 3.14, trailing only the Atlanta Braves at 3.10.

Motte done for season; rookies step up in débuts. On May 3, closer Jason Motte's prognosis showed no improvement and he underwent season-ending Tommy John (elbow ligament) reconstructive surgery the next week.  However, two of the Cardinals' prized pitching prospects made their Major League débuts the same day: Carlos Martínez and Seth Maness each worked one scoreless inning after Miller's six innings in a 6–1 win over the Milwaukee Brewers, their fourth win in a row and seventh in ten games.

Carpenter's surprising progress. On May 4, Chris Carpenter announced that he felt no arm pain and that he hoped to contribute to a bullpen fix after resuming his throwing program.  Mozeliak commented he could return in late June or early July.  He threw an impressive fourth bullpen session of about 70 pitches on May 10, showing all his pitch types, and said afterwards he felt good and ready for a fifth session on May 13.

Back-to-back no-hit near-misses.  On May 10, Shelby Miller continued his excellent season by throwing a one-hit, no-run, masterpiece at home in just his eighth career start, defeating the Colorado Rockies 3–0.  Improving his record to 5–2, Miller lowered his ERA to a dazzling 1.58 and WHIP to 0.88.  He retired the final 27 batters of 28 total after allowing a bloop single to the very first batter, Eric Young, Jr., throwing 84 of 113 pitches for strikes.  With no other blemishes in his "near-perfect" game, Miller struck out a career-high 13, tying the Cardinals' rookie record held by Dick Hughes (1967), and Scipio Spinks (1972) in his first complete-game shutout in the majors and most distinguished start since his début in September 2012. It was also the most-distinguished start by a Cardinal rookie since Bud Smith threw a no-hitter in 2001.  Miller also set a franchise record nine-inning game score of 98.  The next game, Wainwright took a no-hitter into the eighth inning against the Rockies on his way to finishing the game with a two-hit, complete-game shutout, his NL-leading second shutout of the season.  Combining Wainwright's and Miller's efforts, they retired 40 Rockies in a row – tying the major league record – and prevented a base hit for 51 batters in a row. It was only the fifth time in Cardinals' history that two successive starters have given up two hits or less. The last time was on May 2–3, 1967 when Bob Gibson and Ray Washburn each allowed two hits in complete game wins.  Previous years this happened were in 1946, 1942, and 1927.

Infielders out-of-slump. David Freese, shaking off a 91 at-bat homerless slump, hit a grand slam for his first home run of the season in the first inning of a 7–6 victory over the Milwaukee Brewers on May 17.  Four days later, infielder Daniel Descalso hit a grand slam of his own in a 10–2 romp over San Diego.

Rookies bail out veterans.  Rookie pitchers played a key role the first two months of the season, bailing out the pitching staff beset with numerous injuries and ineffectiveness. Starting pitcher Jaime García was yet another casualty, with season-ending shoulder surgery on May 24.  With Michael Wacha's call up on May 30, he became the eighth rookie pitcher on the young season and the third in the month of May to début starting a game. After a 4–1 victory over the Kansas City Royals, rookies accounted for 134 of the Cardinals' 457 innings for the season, sporting a 2.35 ERA. For the month, the rookies combined to go 10–2 with a 2.23 ERA. The overall staff ERA was a major-league leading 3.07. This game left the Cardinals with a major-league best 34–17 record.

On cover of Sports Illustrated. The five starters as of Opening Day (Adam Wainwright, Shelby Miller, Jaime García, Lance Lynn, and Jake Westbrook) were the main story and on the cover of Sports Illustrated (May 27), mirroring the famous 1968 SI cover pose with Roger Maris, Tim McCarver, Bob Gibson, Mike Shannon, and Lou Brock.  At the time of the magazine's release, two (Garcia and Westbrook) were on the disabled list. It was the 39th time the Cardinals have made the cover.

Cardinals have youngest pitching staff in baseball. After Michael Wacha, 21, made his debut on May 30, the Cardinals have the youngest pitching staff in baseball, averaging only 25.0 years in age. The team has used nine rookies and eight pitchers are younger than 25. The rookie pitchers have combined for an MLB-leading 12 wins.

Craziest game of the year. The nine-inning game on May 30, was officially only 2:27 in time, but that didn't count the one-hour rain delay prior to the original start time of 7:15pm, and then the 4:32 delay in the top of the ninth inning from 10:32pm to 3:04am, finally with the game ending at 3:14am on May 31. The reason to wait out the long rain delay was because it was the last trip the Kansas City Royals make to St. Louis, and Rule 4.12(b)(4) would apply, so the Royals persuaded umpire Joe West to keep the game from being called and their three runs in the top of the ninth to be wiped out with them losing 2–1 after eight full innings. They won the argument, and the game 4–2. The game's total 5:32 rain delay was the longest in baseball since October 3, 1999, when the Cincinnati Reds-Milwaukee Brewers had a 5:47 delay.  Although not saddled with the loss, rookie starter Michael Wacha, 21, in his major-league debut lost the chance for a win after dazzling the fans and television audience in retiring the first 13 batters he faced. He gave up a total of just two hits and one run, walking one and striking out six in his seven full innings, holding a 2–1 lead until reliever Mitchell Boggs gave up a game-tying home run leading off the top of the ninth. The game-ending time at 3:14am was the latest ever for a game at Busch Stadium. Wacha had thrown only 73.2 IP in the minors before his call-up and debut. He threw only 93 pitches (67 for strikes), facing 23 batters, retiring 21 of them. His 93 pitches were mostly 92-96 mph fastballs, then change-ups, with only three curveballs. He kept two souvenir balls: his first strikeout (Alex Gordon), and the ball he got a single in his first at-bat. Mitchell Boggs returned to the Cardinals to help the bullpen after 18 days (May 2–20), blew Michael Wacha's 2–1 lead in his debut on May 30, and was demoted a second time to AAA-Memphis the next day, May 31. Boggs' 2013 year now reads: 18 games played in, 0–3, with an 11.05 ERA, 21 hits, 15 walks, 11 strikeouts, and a 2.455 WHIP in 14.2 IP.

Shelby Miller wins award. Shelby Miller won the MLB.com's Pitching Performance of the Month award for May because of his one-hit game on May 10.  He was 2–1, walking only six and striking out 32 for the month, while leading the NL with a 1.82 ERA.

For May, the team was 9–4 at home and 11–3 on the road.  St. Louis scored 133 runs while giving up 85.  (Year: 35–18, 250 runs scored, 178 runs against)

June
David Freese's 20-game hit streak. David Freese's major-league leading 20-game hit streak came to an end on June 12 at Citi Field, with his batting average climbing from .209 to .281. He drove in 16 runs during his streak that started with a grand slam on May 17.

Draft pick signings. The Cardinals reached agreements with their three top draft picks from June 6–8, on June 12. LHP's Marco Gonzales (1st, 19th overall), Rob Kaminsky (1st, 28th overall), and SS Oscar Mercado (2nd, 57th overall) along with six other draftees. No announcement will be made until they pass a physical next week. Mercado signed on June 17 ($1.5 mil.), and will report to the Gulf Coast League Cardinals rookie team in Jupiter, Florida. Other drafted signees include right fielder Ricardo Bautista (12th round), center fielder DeAndre Asbury-Heath (15th round), shortstop Michael Schulze (19th round), center fielder Anthony Ray (36th round), and right-handers Arturo Reyes (40th round) and Brandon Lee (undrafted). First round pick LHP Kaminsky signed on June 18 ($1.785 mil.), and will also report to the Gulf Coast League Cardinals. Nine players signed on June 18, seven draftees and two free agents, for a total of 31 drafted and four free agents. First pick, LHP Marco Gonzales rated #28 in the Top 500 prospects by Baseball America, signed on June 19 ($1.85 mil.), and will also report to the Gulf Coast League Cardinals. Gonzales had a 7–3 2.80 ERA in 16 starts for the Gonzaga Bulldogs, and also led the team in hitting with a .311 average.

Yadier Molina leading NL hitters. A rarity when a catcher is leading a league in batting. But Yadier Molina is doing that in the NL with his .358 (.3578, 83-in-232) mark after the June 12 game when he went 3-for-4, boosting his average from the NL-leading .351 in the game before. Second place is Troy Tulowitzki (CO Rockies) with a .347 average. Miguel Cabrera (Det. Tigers) is leading the majors and the AL also with a .358 (.3583) average, just .0005 over Molina for the MLB lead.

Adam Wainwright wins 10th. On June 13, Adam Wainwright became the first MLB pitcher in 2013 to win 10 games, pitching seven scoreless innings as the Cardinals beat the New York Mets 2–1 at Citi Field. He scattered four hits, and struck out six in the victory. Wainwright achieved a career milestone early in the game as his first strikeout of the day, on David Wright, was the 1,000th of his career. He has a career 133 ERA+, the 4th highest for an active pitcher who has a minimum of 1,000 innings.

Cardinals, a model franchise. Richard Justice, a columnist for MLB.com, wrote on June 14, the Cardinals have the 11th-highest payroll, but enjoy its best record (43–23 .652 with a -game lead), with the 11th–1st difference indicating in a nutshell why the club has a great baseball organization.

Only 3rd series lost, June 14–16. The Cardinals lost a 2-of-3 series to the Miami Marlins, only the 3rd series lost in the season (after 69 games) since a 2-of-3 loss to the Pittsburgh Pirates on April 26–28. The team leads MLB in a .342 batting average with RISP (runners in scoring position), while the Chicago Cubs have the worst batting average with a .226 when RISP.

Adam Wainwright wins NL Pitcher of Month award. Adam Wainwright was named NL Pitcher of the Month for June with a 4–2 1.77 ERA record. He struck out 40 while issuing only six walks, holding opposing batters to a .220 average. For the year, he is 11–5 with a 2.22 ERA, leading all of baseball with four complete games and a 9.5 strikeout-to-walk ratio.

July
Jon Jay's errorless streak record. On July 4, Jon Jay established a new NL all-time errorless streak record for centerfielders at 227 games (534 chances) against the Los Angeles Angels of Anaheim, and the Cardinals outfield record; his last error was on August 24, 2011.  On July 30, the streak ended against the division rivals Pittsburgh Pirates at 245 games.  Curt Flood owned the previous record of 226 games spanning from September 3, 1965 to June 2, 1967.

Five Cardinals selected for All-Star Game.  On July 6, five Cardinals were announced to be in the 84th All-Star Game on July 16, the most for any NL team.  Yadier Molina (.346, 6 HR, 45 RBIs) garnered the most votes in the National League with over 6.8 million while winning the spot as the starting catcher.  At the All-Star break, he led the NL with a .346 batting average.  Carlos Beltrán (.305, 19 HR, 51 RBIs) received the highest vote total for outfielders.  Matt Carpenter (.319, 8 HR, 37 RBIs), the Cardinals' leadoff hitter, led the NL with 34 multihit games and was a reserve at second base.  Pitcher Adam Wainwright (11–5, 2.36 ERA, 120 H, 3 HR, 13 BB, 117 K in 18 GS, 133.2 IP) was picked by the fans, leading the NL in innings pitched.  Allen Craig (.325, 10 HR, 68 RBIs) was selected by manager Bruce Bochy. He also led the NL with a .476 batting average with men in scoring position, and was second in the league with 68 RBIs.  Wainwright had the option of remaining on the active All-Star roster and pitching a maximum of one inning, per a new CBA rule that amended the previous rule that stopped pitchers who pitched the previous Sunday from pitching in the game. He received the fourth-most pitcher votes.

Team led MLB in BA w/RISP. After the first 106 games played (July 31; 62–44), the team led MLB with a .333 BA with RISP.  Second were the Detroit Tigers with a .294.  The .333 batting average is the best in over 50 years and so far ahead of Detroit, the Cardinals could go hitless with RISP in the next 131 at-bats, still lead the majors, and go hitless in their next 235 at-bats and still lead the NL.  Allen Craig led the NL with a .465 average, Matt Carpenter was third (.400), and Yadier Molina fifth (.385). Carlos Beltrán (.367) and Matt Holliday (.365) were also in the top nine in the NL.  Craig's figure was the highest in a season since George Brett (.469) in 1980.

August
Ended L.A.'s 15-game road win streak. The home game win on August 6 against their ace Clayton Kershaw (10–6, 1.87), highlighted by four double plays (fourth time in a 2013 game), ended the L.A. Dodgers fourth-best in MLB history's 15-game road winning streak. The 1912 Washington Senators had 16, and the record of 17 stays with the 1916 New York Giants, later tied by the 1984 Detroit Tigers. The Cardinals 134 double plays turned lead all of MLB, including an NL-leading 12 by reliever Seth Maness who has turned them in only 39.1 IP. The team (66–46) stayed two games behind the NL Central leading Pirates, while the Dodgers (62–50) continue leading the NL West over Arizona by five games.

Kolten Wong arrives. On August 16, Kolten Wong, the number 4 top prospect in the organization, arrived from AAA-Memphis, and was immediately placed sixth in the lineup playing his second base position against the Cubs. He batted .303 with a .369 OBP in 107 games at AAA, stealing 20 bases in 21 attempts. He becomes the 18th rookie to appear for the Cardinals this season, tops among MLB teams and the most used by the Cardinals since 1997 when they had 19.

Wainwright passes Bob Forsch, Chris Carpenter in strikeouts. On August 18, Adam Wainwright passed Bob Forsch (1,079) for fourth place on the all-time Cardinals' strikeout list, behind only Chris Carpenter (1,085), Dizzy Dean (1,095), and Bob Gibson (3,117) with his 1,081st against the Cubs at Wrigley Field in striking out 11, and winning for career win 94 against 55 losses for a .631 win percentage. Wainwright became only the fourth pitcher to go 6–0 in his career at that 99-year-old storied stadium. With the win, Wainwright ties for the NL lead in wins with 14 along with the Nationals' Jordan Zimmermann. With his NL-leading 15th win on August 23 (at home), he struck out nine Braves giving him 1,090 strikeouts, passing teammate Chris Carpenter for third place. He also pitched a complete game, giving him an NL-leading five, and 16 for his career. His ERA as a Cardinal is 3.06 compared to 3.07 for Carpenter.

Broadcaster Mike Shannon has successful heart surgery. Radio voice Mike Shannon had successful heart surgery on August 19, to repair a defective aorta valve. The surgery had been planned for some time, and he will make a complete recovery. He will miss most of the remainder of the season, but plans to return on September 23. The team will employ a broadcasting rotation of Al Hrabosky, Rick Horton, and Mike Claiborne to join his regular co-broadcaster John Rooney until then.

Cardinals expect to add 5–10 callups in September. GM John Mozeliak expects a larger number of callups than usual in September, between five and 10, when rosters expand starting on Sunday, September 1. The team plays 29 games over the final 31 days of the regular season. A callup must be on the 40-man roster. There is one open spot on the 40-man roster.

Cardinals regain sole possession of first place. Opening a critical stretch of 13 games against their two top contenders, the Pittsburgh and Cincinnati, the game on August 26 had the Cardinals climb out of a steep 4–0 deficit after two innings, on two big home run blasts by Matt Holliday and Allen Craig. Holliday's 3-run HR in the third inning was a mammoth 442-foot blast into Big Mac land, cutting the deficit to only 4–3. Craig's very first grand slam in the seventh was a memorable one, highlighting a five-run inning, giving them the lead, 8–5 at the time. He is 6-for-7 with the bases loaded with two outs, and 7-for-10 with the bases loaded, giving him 15 RBIs of his 95 total. It was Craig's 50th career home run, and increased his now MLB-leading .452 average (57-for-126 with 4 HRs and 82 RBIs with a .500 OBP and .643 SLG) with runners in scoring position. His 95 RBIs are second in the NL only to the 103 by Paul Goldsmith of the Arizona Diamondbacks and tied with Brandon Phillips of the Reds. Jon Jay helped with two great catches in centerfield, and Edward Mujica got his 35th save out of 36 opportunities. The Reds with the tough loss fell  games in back of the Cardinals, with the Cardinals winning 9 of 13 against them so far this season. The final score was 8–6, with Carlos Martinez getting his first major league win, on a hot night with 93 degrees at the 6:05 game time (on ESPN), and 35,159 in attendance.

Cards acquire RHP reliever John Axford. The Cardinals acquired Milwaukee Brewers closer John Axford, 30, on August 30, in exchange for a player to be named later. No cash changed hands, leaving the Cardinals to pay Axford the approximately $1 mil. remaining on his $5 mil. 2013 contract. He is eligible for arbitration after the season, and the Cardinals can either non-tender him after the season or work out a new contract for him. He has not saved a game in 2013, and has a 4.45 ERA in 62 games. This is the first deal between the Cardinals and Brewers in 10 years. This is the first deal the Cardinals have done this season to add to the club, and needed to be done before the August 31 deadline so Axford could be on the postseason roster.

September
Matt Carpenter ties Hornsby's doubles record. Matt Carpenter hit his 46th double on September 4, tying Rogers Hornsby's mark for a Cardinals' hitter who primarily plays second base. He broke Hornsby's record with his NL-leading 47th double on September 6, also leading the NL in Hits (172) and Runs (110), and is a serious contender for the MVP Award.

Wainwright now second in strikeouts. Adam Wainwright struck out eight batters in the September 7 game at home against the first-place Pittsburgh Pirates for 1,103 strikeouts in his career, passing Dizzy Dean (1,095) for second place among Cardinals' pitchers. Only Bob Gibson (3,117 in 528 games) has more strikeouts. He threw seven shutout innings giving the Pirates only two hits and two walks, picking up his league-leading 16th win against nine losses, and a 3.03 ERA. He now has 195 strikeouts for the season, second only to the L.A. Dodgers' Clayton Kershaw who has 201. The win also pushed the Cardinals back into first-place by just  game in the see-saw Central division against the Pirates, and only  games ahead of the Cincinnati Reds. Wainwright was coming off the two worst games of his career, giving up 15 earned runs and 17 hits in those two games totaling eight innings. He leads the NL in wins (tied), innings pitched (213.2), hits giving up (198), games started (30), and batters faced (846).

10 consecutive years over 3 million. For the 10th consecutive year starting in 2004, the Cardinals attained over 3 million attendance with 40,506 in the 10-inn. 2–1 win over the visiting Seattle Mariners on September 13. After this 73rd home game, the attendance totals 3,037,191 for an average of 41,605 per game.

Mujica removed as Closer. Edward Mujica was removed as closer on September 21, because of fatigue. He has 37 saves, but failed to convert three out of his last five chances.

Carpenter breaks Musial's record for Doubles. Matt Carpenter broke Stan Musial's record for doubles (53 in 1953) by a left-handed batter with his 54th on September 21. Joe Medwick owns the Cardinals' record with 64 in 1936. Carpenter's .328 BA, 67 RBI, 61 extra-base hits, 105 runs, and .488 slugging pct. are tops amongst all Major League leadoff men, and his 194 hits are tops in the NL. He led the majors with his 55 doubles, 126 runs scored, 199 hits, and 63 multi-hit games. He also set the Busch Stadium III record with 112 hits. He hit .318 ranking sixth in the NL, and fourth in hitting with runners in scoring position with his .388.

Cardinals clinch playoff berth. With the Washington Nationals losing to the Miami Marlins on September 22, the St. Louis Cardinals clinch a playoff berth. Manager Mike Matheny becomes the first Cardinals' manager to take his team to the playoffs in his first two seasons since Gabby Street did it with the 1930 and 1931 Cardinals.

Shannon returns to radio booth. Radio broadcaster Mike Shannon (74) returned to the radio booth for the remaining six games, all at home, starting September 23. He was out for almost six weeks since before his August 19 heart aorta valve replacement surgery.

Michael Wacha almost throws no-hitter. Rookie Michael Wacha (22), acquired in the 2012 draft with the 19th overall pick from the Los Angeles Angels as compensation for losing Albert Pujols almost threw a no-hitter at home on September 24, against the Washington Nationals. He pitched 8.2 innings and 112 pitches (77 for strikes) with no hits, two walks, and one error against him before a little squibbler in the infield became the only hit against him. He struck out nine. He was then relieved on the final out for his fourth win of the season. He has pitched only 64.2 innings in the majors in 2013. He became the third pitcher to lose a no-hitter with two outs in the ninth this year, and it would have been the 11th no-hitter in Cardinals' history, with the last one in September 2001 by Bud Smith, who coincidentally wore uniform 52, same as Wacha. The 1-hitter was the second in 2013 for a Cardinals' pitcher: Shelby Miller gave up a hit to the first batter, and then retired the next 27 on May 10.

Lohse continues to pay dividends. Kyle Lohse, who made news earlier in the year by rejecting the Cardinals' $13.3 million qualifying and signing with the Brewers with one week to go in spring training, continued to aid the Cardinals as they pursued the Central division title and best record in the NL for home-field advantage until the World Series.  Lohse threw his first complete game of the season against the Red in a 5–1 victory on September 13, dropping the Reds  games behind the Cardinals.  On September 25, Lohse threw his second complete game and first shutout of the season, a two-hit, 2–0 triumph over the Atlanta Braves.  This win allowed the Cardinals to move ahead of the Braves by  game for best record in the NL.

Cardinals clinch NL Central on September 27. The Cardinals clinched the NL Central title at home on September 27. It was their first NL Central title since 2009. It was their seventh division title since 2000, thanks to 20 rookies, 12 of them had never before appeared in the majors before this year. They were second three consecutive years prior to 2013. The club has a 16–6 record since Allen Craig was lost for the remainder of the regular season on September 4, with a foot injury. The club previously lost their ace (Chris Carpenter), their shortstop (Rafael Furcal), and their closer (Jason Motte) before Opening Day, plus two more starting pitchers in May and then cleanup hitter Craig, who has the majors highest batting average (.454) with runners in scoring position. He has been ruled doubtful for the 2013 National League Division Series against the Pittsburgh Pirates, because of his Lisfranc injury to his left foot.

Cardinals set new RISP mark, other highlights. The team set a new baseball record for hitting efficiency with runners in scoring position. They hit .330 (447-for-1,355), the best in baseball since the Boston Red Sox hit .312 in 1950, also beating the 2007 Detroit Tigers, and 1996 Colorado Rockies with a .311 average. Only George Brett (.469 in 1980) and Tony Gwynn (.459 in 1997) did better than Allen Craig, with his .454 led everyone in 2013. Freddie Freeman (Atlanta Braves) at .443 was second, with Matt Holliday at .390 third, Matt Carpenter at .388 fourth, Carlos Beltrán at .374 fifth, and Yadier Molina at .373 sixth. Molina's 44 doubles (#2 in NL, #3 in MLB) were the most by a catcher since Iván Rodríguez had 47 in 1996. With 19 wins, Adam Wainwright is the third Cardinals pitcher to lead the league in wins twice in his career (2009 and this season, when he tied with Washington's Jordan Zimmermann), joining Mort Cooper and Dizzy Dean. Bob Gibson led just once, in 1970 with 23. The Cardinals' 36 wins from rookies this season are the most since 1941. The Cardinals set a franchise record for fewest errors, with 75 and highest fielding percentage .988 beating their 2003 season with 77 errors and .987 average. They hit .305 with runners in scoring position and two outs. They hit .370 with the bases loaded with four grand slams. They had the second-lowest staff ERA 3.42 which is second only to the L.A. Dodgers 3.13.

Season standings

National League Central

National League Wild Card

Schedule and results

Game log
Major League Baseball released the 2013 schedule of all 30 major teams on September 12, 2012.  On Opening Day, the Cardinals played the Arizona Diamondbacks at Chase Field in Phoenix, Arizona, on April 1 at 9:10pm CDT and was nationally televised on ESPN2 as part of its Opening Day marathon.  Fox Sports Midwest (FSMW) televised 150 games.  FSMW hired former Cardinals center fielder Jim Edmonds to replace former pitcher Cal Eldred as the primary analyst for pregame and postgame shows.

Schedule: Calendar style | Sortable text | National Broadcast Schedule (Cardinals), EDT || 
Downloadable: Microsoft Outlook and Palm (PDA)
All game times below were in the Central Time Zone (CST).

|-  style="text-align:center; background:#fbb;"
| 1 || April 1 || @ Diamondbacks 9:10pm (ESPN2) || 6–2 || Kennedy (1–0) || Wainwright (0–1) || || 48,033 || 0–1
|-  style="text-align:center; background:#bfb;"
| 2 || April 2 || @ Diamondbacks 8:40pm || 6–1 || García (1–0) || Cahill (0–1) || || 28,387 || 1–1
|-  style="text-align:center; background:#fbb;"
| 3 || April 3 || @ Diamondbacks 8:40pm || 10–9 (16) || Collmenter (1–0) || Salas (0–1) || || 26,896 || 1–2
|-  style="text-align:center; background:#fbb;"
| 4 || April 5 || @ Giants 3:35pm || 1–0 || Zito (1–0) || Westbrook (0–1) || Romo (3) || 41,581 || 1–3
|-  style="text-align:center; background:#bfb;"
| 5 || April 6 || @ Giants 3:05pm (Fox) || 6–3 || Miller (1–0) || Vogelsong (0–1) || Boggs (1) || 41,402 || 2–3
|-  style="text-align:center; background:#bfb;"
| 6 || April 7 || @ Giants 3:05pm || 14–3 || Wainwright (1–1) || Cain (0–1) || || 42,201 || 3–3
|-  style="text-align:center; background:#fbb;"
| 7 || April 8 || Reds 3:15pm || 13–4 || LeCure (1–0) || Boggs (0–1) || || 47,345 || 3–4
|-  style="text-align:center; background:#bfb;"
| 8 || April 9 || Reds 7:15pm  || 5–1 || Lynn (1–0) || Arroyo (1–1) || || 37,731 || 4–4 
|-  style="text-align:center; background:#bfb;"
| 9 || April 10 || Reds 12:45pm  || 10–0 || Westbrook (1–1) || Bailey (1–1) || || 34,882 || 5–4 
|-  style="text-align:center; background:#bfb;"
| 10 || April 12 || Brewers 7:15pm || 2–0 || Miller (2–0) || Lohse (0–1) || Boggs (2) || 42,528 || 6–4
|-  style="text-align:center; background:#bfb;"
| 11 || April 13 || Brewers 3:15pm || 8–0 || Wainwright (2–1) || Gallardo (0–1) || || 44,696 || 7–4
|-  style="text-align:center; background:#fbb;"
| 12 || April 14 || Brewers 1:15pm || 4–3 (10) || Kintzler (1–0) || Salas (0–2) || Badenhop (1) || 42,645 || 7–5
|-  style="text-align:center; background:#bfb;"
| 13 || April 15 || @ Pirates 6:05pm || 10–6 || Lynn (2–0) || McDonald (1–2) || || 10,539 || 8–5
|-  style="text-align:center; background:#bbb;"
| – || April 16 || @ Pirates 6:05pm ||colspan=6| PPD, RAIN; rescheduled for July 30
|-  style="text-align:center; background:#fbb;"
| 14 || April 17 || @ Pirates 6:05pm || 5–0 || Burnett (1–2) || Miller (2–1) || || 9,570 || 8–6
|-  style="text-align:center; background:#bfb;"
| 15 || April 18 || @ Phillies 6:05pm || 4–3 || Wainwright (3–1) || Adams (0–1) || Mujica (1) || 34,256 || 9–6
|-  style="text-align:center; background:#fbb;"
| 16 || April 19 || @ Phillies 6:05pm || 8–2 (6.5) || Halladay (2–2) || García (1–1) || || 34,092 || 9–7
|-  style="text-align:center; background:#bfb;"
| 17 || April 20 || @ Phillies 6:05pm || 5–0 || Lynn (3–0) || Lee (2–1) || || 41,050 || 10–7
|-  style="text-align:center; background:#fbb;"
| 18 || April 21 || @ Phillies 7:05pm (ESPN) || 7–3 || Adams (1–1) || Boggs (0–2) || || 35,115 || 10–8
|-  style="text-align:center; background:#bfb;"
| 19 || April 22 || @ Nationals 6:05pm || 3–2 || Miller (3–1) || Haren (1–3) || Mujica (2) || 27,263 || 11–8
|-  style="text-align:center; background:#bfb;"
| 20 || April 23 || @ Nationals 6:05pm || 2–0 || Wainwright (4–1) || Detwiler (1–1) || Mujica (3) || 29,986 || 12–8
|-  style="text-align:center; background:#bfb;"
| 21 || April 24 || @ Nationals 12:05pm || 4–2 || García (2–1) || Strasburg (1–4) || Mujica (4) || 33,694 || 13–8
|-  style="text-align:center; background:#bfb;"
| 22 || April 26 || Pirates 7:15pm || 9–1 || Lynn (4–0) || Sánchez (0–3) || || 44,090 || 14–8
|-  style="text-align:center; background:#fbb;"
| 23 || April 27 || Pirates 3:15pm || 5–3 || Burnett (2–2) || Kelly (0–1) || Grilli (10) || 40,909 || 14–9
|-  style="text-align:center; background:#fbb;"
| 24 || April 28 || Pirates 1:15pm || 9–0 || Locke (3–1) || Miller (3–2) || || 41,470 || 14–10
|-  style="text-align:center; background:#fbb;"
| 25 || April 29 || Reds 7:15pm || 2–1 || Latos (2–0) || Wainwright (4–2) || Chapman (6) || 36,681 || 14–11
|-  style="text-align:center; background:#bfb;"
| 26 || April 30 || Reds 7:15pm || 2–1 || García (3–1) || Arroyo (2–3) || Mujica (5) || 37,535 || 15–11
|-

|-  style="text-align:center; background:#bfb;"
| 27 || May 1 || Reds 12:45pm ||  4–2 || Lynn (5–0) || Bailey (1–3) || Mujica (6) || 39,821 || 16–11
|-  style="text-align:center; background:#bfb;"
| 28 || May 2 || @ Brewers 7:10pm || 6–5 || Westbrook (2–1) || Peralta (2–2) || Mujica (7) || 22,204 || 17–11
|-  style="text-align:center; background:#bfb;"
| 29 || May 3 || @ Brewers 7:10pm || 6–1 || Miller (4–2) || Lohse (1–3) || || 40,068 || 18–11
|-  style="text-align:center; background:#bfb;"
| 30 || May 4 || @ Brewers 3:05pm (Fox) || 7–6 || Maness (1–0) || Henderson (2–1) || Mujica (8) || 36,156 || 19–11
|-  style="text-align:center; background:#bfb;"
| 31 || May 5 || @ Brewers 1:10pm || 10–1 || García (4–1) || Estrada (2–2) || || 38,620 || 20–11
|-  style="text-align:center; background:#fbb;"
| 32 || May 7 || @ Cubs 7:05pm || 2–1 || Wood (3–2) || Lynn (5–1) || Gregg (5) || 30,161 || 20–12
|-  style="text-align:center; background:#bfb;"
| 33 || May 8 || @ Cubs 1:20pm  || 5–4 || Maness (2–0) || Bowden (1–2) || Mujica (9) || 26,354 || 21–12
|-  style="text-align:center; background:#bfb;"
| 34 || May 10 || Rockies 7:15pm || 3–0 || Miller (5–2) || Garland (3–3) || || 37,800 || 22–12
|-  style="text-align:center; background:#bfb;"
| 35 || May 11 || Rockies 1:15pm || 3–0 || Wainwright (5–2) || Chacín (3–2) || || 43,050 || 23–12
|-  style="text-align:center; background:#fbb;"
| 36 || May 12 || Rockies 1:15pm || 8–2 || de la Rosa (4–3) || García (4–2)  || || 40,881 || 23–13
|-  style="text-align:center; background:#bfb;"
| 37 || May 13 || Mets 6:05pm (ESPN) || 6–3 || Lynn (6–1) || Rice (1–3)  || Mujica (10) || 38,412 || 24–13
|-  style="text-align:center; background:#bfb;"
| 38 || May 14 || Mets 7:15pm || 10–4 || Gast (1–0) || Gee (2–5)  || || 37,460 || 25–13
|-  style="text-align:center; background:#bfb;"
| 39 || May 15 || Mets 7:15pm || 4–2 || Maness (3–0) || Marcum (0–4)  || Mujica (11) || 38,143 || 26–13
|-  style="text-align:center; background:#fbb;"
| 40 || May 16 || Mets 12:45pm || 5–2 || Niese (3–4) || Wainwright (5–3)  || Parnell (4) || 44,068 || 26–14
|-  style="text-align:center; background:#bfb;"
| 41 || May 17 || Brewers 7:15pm || 7–6 || García (5–2) || Peralta (3–4)  || Mujica (12) || 39,426 || 27–14
|-  style="text-align:center; background:#fbb;"
| 42 || May 18 || Brewers 6:15pm || 6–4 (10) || Axford (1–3) || Kelly (0–2)  || Henderson (8) || 42,410 || 27–15
|-  style="text-align:center; background:#bfb;"
| 43 || May 19 || Brewers 1:15pm || 4–2 || Gast (2–0) || Lohse (1–5)  || Mujica (13) || 39,878 || 28–15
|- style="text-align:center;" bgcolor="ffbbbb"
| 44 || May 20 || @ Padres 9:10pm || 4–2 || Marquis (6–2) || Miller (5–3)  || Street (11) || 18,763 || 28–16
|- style="text-align:center;" bgcolor="bbffbb"
| 45 || May 21 || @ Padres 9:10pm || 10–2 || Wainwright (6–3) || Vólquez (3–5)  || || 18,702 || 29–16
|- style="text-align:center;" bgcolor="bbffbb"
| 46 || May 22 || @ Padres 9:10pm || 5–3 || Lyons (1–0) || Smith (0–1) || || 18,683 || 30–16
|- style="text-align:center;" bgcolor="bbffbb"
| 47 || May 24 || @ Dodgers 9:10pm || 7–0 || Lynn (7–1) || Capuano (1–3) || || 45,134 || 31–16
|- style="text-align:center;" bgcolor="ffbbbb"
| 48 || May 25 || @ Dodgers 6:15pm (Fox) || 5–3 || Rodriguez (1–2) || Maness (3–1)  || League (10) || 49,368 || 31–17
|- style="text-align:center;" bgcolor="bbffbb"
| 49 || May 26 || @ Dodgers 3:10pm || 5–3 || Maness (4–1) || Kershaw (5–3) || Mujica (14) || 43,244 || 32–17
|- style="text-align:center;" bgcolor="bbffbb"
| 50 || May 27 || @ Royals 1:10pm || 6–3 || Wainwright (7–3) || Shields (2–6) || Mujica (15) || 34,746 || 33–17 
|- style="text-align:center;" bgcolor="bbffbb"
| 51 || May 28 || @ Royals 7:10pm || 4–1 || Lyons (2–0) || Santana (3–5) || Mujica (16) || 27,823 || 34–17
|- style="text-align:center;" bgcolor="bbffbb"
| 52 || May 29 || Royals 7:15pm || 5–3 || Choate (1–0) || Crow (0–1) || Mujica (17) || 43,477 || 35–17
|- style="text-align:center;" bgcolor="ffbbbb"
| 53 || May 30 || Royals 7:15pm || 4–2 || Coleman (1–0) || Boggs (0–3) || Holland (8) || 43,916 || 35–18 
|-  style="text-align:center; background:#bbb;"
| – || May 31 || Giants 7:15pm ||colspan=6| PPD, RAIN; rescheduled for June 1
|-

|- style="text-align:center;" bgcolor="bbffbb"
| 54 || June 1 || Giants 12:15pm || 8–0 || Miller (6–3) || Cain (4–3) || || 42,359 || 36–18
|- style="text-align:center;" bgcolor="bbffbb"
| 55 || June 1 || Giants 6:15pm (Fox) || 7–1 || Wainwright (8–3) || Bumgarner (4–4) || || 42,175 || 37–18
|- style="text-align:center;" bgcolor="ffbbbb"
| 56 || June 2 || Giants 1:15pm || 4–2 || Gaudin (1–1) || Lyons (2–1) || Romo (15) || 43,817 || 37–19
|- style="text-align:center;" bgcolor="bbffbb"
| 57 || June 3 || Diamondbacks 7:15pm || 7–1 || Lynn (8–1) || Cahill (3–6) || || 38,042 || 38–19
|- style="text-align:center;" bgcolor="ffbbbb"
| 58 || June 4 || Diamondbacks 7:15pm || 7–6 (14) || Collmenter (2–0) || Marte (0–1) || Bell (10) || 39,222 || 38–20 
|- style="text-align:center;" bgcolor="ffbbbb"
| 59 || June 5 || Diamondbacks 7:15pm || 10–3 || Miley (4–5) || Kelly (0–3) || || 40,792 || 38–21
|- style="text-align:center;" bgcolor="bbffbb"
| 60 || June 6 || Diamondbacks 6:15pm || 12–8 || Miller (7–3) || Kennedy (3–4) || Mujica (18) || 43,798 || 39–21
|- style="text-align:center;" bgcolor="bbffbb"
| 61 || June 7 || @ Reds 6:10pm || 9–2 || Wainwright (9–3) || Leake (5–3) || || 38,874 || 40–21
|- style="text-align:center;" bgcolor="ffbbbb"
| 62 || June 8 || @ Reds 6:15pm (Fox) || 4–2 || Latos (6–0) || Lyons (2–2) || Chapman (16) || 40,740 || 40–22 
|- style="text-align:center;" bgcolor="bbffbb"
| 63 || June 9 || @ Reds 7:10pm (ESPN) || 11–4 (10) || Rosenthal (1–0) || Hoover (0–5) || || 38,023 || 41–22
|- style="text-align:center;" bgcolor="bbffbb"
| 64 || June 11 || @ Mets 6:10pm || 9–2 || Wacha (1–0) || Hefner (1–6) || || 21,581 || 42–22
|- style="text-align:center;" bgcolor="ffbbbb"
| 65 || June 12 || @ Mets 6:10pm || 5–1 || Gee (5–6) || Miller (7–4) || || 23,331 || 42–23
|- style="text-align:center;" bgcolor="bbffbb"
| 66 || June 13 || @ Mets 12:10pm || 2–1 || Wainwright (10–3) || Harvey (5–1) || Mujica (19) || 25,471 || 43–23
|- style="text-align:center;" bgcolor="ffbbbb"
| 67 || June 14 || @ Marlins 6:10pm || 5–4 || Fernandez (4–3) || Westbrook (2–2) || Cishek (8) || 15,403 || 43–24
|- style="text-align:center;" bgcolor="bbffbb"
| 68 || June 15 || @ Marlins 3:10pm || 13–7 || Lynn (9–1) || Koehler (0–5) || || 16,098 || 44–24
|- style="text-align:center;" bgcolor="ffbbbb"
| 69 || June 16 || @ Marlins 12:10pm || 7–2 || Nolasco (4–7) || Lyons (2–3) || Cishek (9) || 18,468 || 44–25
|- style="text-align:center;" bgcolor="bbffbb"
| 70 || June 17 || Cubs 6:05pm (ESPN) || 5–2 || Miller (8–4) || Wood (5–6) || Mujica (20) || 44,172 || 45–25 
|- style="text-align:center;" bgcolor="ffbbbb"
| 71 || June 18 || Cubs 7:15pm || 4–2 || Samardzija (4–7) || Wainwright (10–4) || Gregg (10) || 44,139 || 45–26
|- style="text-align:center;" bgcolor="bbffbb"
| 72 || June 19 || Cubs 7:15pm || 4–1 || Westbrook (3–2) || Jackson (3–9) || Mujica (21) || 43,878 || 46–26
|- style="text-align:center;" bgcolor="bbffbb"
| 73 || June 20 || Cubs 7:15pm || 6–1 || Lynn (10–1) || Feldman (6–6) || || 43,651 || 47–26
|- style="text-align:center;" bgcolor="ffbbbb"
| 74 || June 21 || Rangers 7:15pm || 6–4 || Cotts (4–1) || Rosenthal (1–1) || Nathan (23) || 45,228 || 47–27
|- style="text-align:center;" bgcolor="ffbbbb"
| 75 || June 22 || Rangers 6:15pm (Fox) || 4–2 || Pérez (1–1) || Miller (8–5) || Nathan (24) || 44,651 || 47–28
|- style="text-align:center;" bgcolor="ffbbbb"
| 76 || June 23 || Rangers 7:05pm (ESPN) || 2–1 || Ross (4–1) || Wainwright (10–5) || Nathan (25) || 44,063 || 47–29 
|- style="text-align:center;" bgcolor="bbffbb"
| 77 || June 25 || @ Astros 7:10pm || 13–5 || Westbrook (4–2) || Harrell (5–8) || || 19,271 || 48–29
|- style="text-align:center;" bgcolor="ffbbbb"
| 78 || June 26 || @ Astros 7:10pm || 4–3 || Bedard (3–3) || Lynn (10–2) || Veras (16) || 17,428 || 48–30
|- style="text-align:center;" bgcolor="ffbbbb"
| 79 || June 28 || @ Athletics 9:05pm || 6–1 || Colón (11–2) || Miller (8–6) || || 24,208 || 48–31
|- style="text-align:center;" bgcolor="bbffbb"
| 80 || June 29 || @ Athletics 3:05pm || 7–1 || Wainwright (11–5) || Chavez (1–2) || || 35,067 || 49–31
|- style="text-align:center;" bgcolor="ffbbbb"
| 81 || June 30 || @ Athletics 3:05pm || 7–5 || Milone (7–7) || Westbrook (4–3) || Balfour (19) || 20,673 || 49–32
|-

|- style="text-align:center;" bgcolor="ffbbbb"
| 82 || July 2 || @ Angels 9:05pm || 5–1 || Weaver (2–4) || Lynn (10–3) || || 39,455 || 49–33
|- style="text-align:center;" bgcolor="bbffbb"
| 83 || July 3 || @ Angels 9:05pm || 12–2 || Miller (9–6) || Williams (5–4) || || 35,025 || 50–33
|- style="text-align:center;" bgcolor="ffbbbb"
| 84 || July 4 || @ Angels 8:05pm || 6–5 || Downs (2–2) || Mujica (0–1) || || 42,707 || 50–34
|- style="text-align:center;" bgcolor="bbffbb"
| 85 || July 5 || Marlins 7:15pm || 4–1 || Westbrook (5–3) || Turner (2–1) || Mujica (22) || 46,177 ||  51–34 
|- style="text-align:center;" bgcolor="bbffbb"
| 86 || July 6 || Marlins 1:15pm || 5–4 || Mujica (1–1) || Ramos (3–3) || || 45,475 || 52–34 
|- style="text-align:center;" bgcolor="bbffbb"
| 87 || July 7 || Marlins 1:15pm || 3–2 || Lynn (11–3) || Fernández (5–5) || Mujica (23) || 43,741 || 53–34
|- style="text-align:center;" bgcolor="bbffbb"
| 88 || July 9 || Astros 7:15pm || 9–5 || Wainwright (12–5) || Norris (6–8) || Mujica (24) || 43,836 || 54–34
|- style="text-align:center;" bgcolor="bbffbb"
| 89 || July 10 || Astros 7:15pm || 5–4 || Maness (5–1) || Wright (0–3) || Mujica (25) || 44,313 || 55–34
|- style="text-align:center;" bgcolor="ffbbbb"
| 90 || July 11 || @ Cubs 7:05pm || 3–0 || Jackson (6–10) || Westbrook (5–4) || Gregg (16) || 35,379 || 55–35
|- style="text-align:center;" bgcolor="bbffbb"
| 91 || July 12 || @ Cubs 3:05pm || 3–2 || Kelly (1–3) || Villanueva (2–5) || Mujica (26) || 37,322 || 56–35
|- style="text-align:center;" bgcolor="ffbbbb"
| 92 || July 13 || @ Cubs 6:15pm (Fox) || 6–4 || Garza (6–1) || Lynn (11–4) || Gregg (17) || 42,240 || 56–36
|- style="text-align:center;" bgcolor="bbffbb"
| 93 || July 14 || @ Cubs 7:05pm (ESPN) || 10–6 || Mujica (2–1) || Gregg (2–2) || || 35,178 || 57–36
|-  style="text-align:center; background:#bbb;"
| – || July 16 || 84th All-Star Game ||colspan=6|National League 0,   American League 3   (New York;  Citi Field) on Fox Sports
|- style="text-align:center;" bgcolor="bbffbb"
| 94 || July 19 || Padres 7:15pm || 9–6 || Westbrook (6–4) || Marquis (9–5) || Mujica (27) || 43,929 || 58–36
|- style="text-align:center;" bgcolor="ffbbbb"
| 95 || July 20 || Padres 6:15pm || 5–3 || Vólquez (7–8) || Lynn (11–5) || Street (16) || 45,288 || 58–37
|- style="text-align:center;" bgcolor="bbffbb"
| 96 || July 21 || Padres 1:15pm || 3–2 || Wainwright (13–5) || Stults (8–8) || Mujica (28) || 44,033 || 59–37
|- style="text-align:center;" bgcolor="bbffbb"
| 97 || July 23 || Phillies 7:15pm || 4–1 || Miller (10–6) || Pettibone (5–4) || Mujica (29) || 44,780 || 60–37
|- style="text-align:center;" bgcolor="bbffbb"
| 98 || July 24 || Phillies 7:15pm || 11–3 || Westbrook (7–4) || Lannan (2–4) || || 44,317 || 61–37
|- style="text-align:center;" bgcolor="bbffbb"
| 99 || July 25 || Phillies 6:15pm || 3–1 || Lynn (12–5) || Kendrick (9–7) || Mujica (30) || 45,567 || 62–37
|- style="text-align:center;" bgcolor="ffbbbb"
| 100 || July 26 || @ Braves 6:30pm || 4–1 || Minor (10–5) || Wainwright (13–6) || Kimbrel (29) || 50,124 || 62–38
|- style="text-align:center;" bgcolor="ffbbbb"
| 101 || July 27 || @ Braves 2:05pm (Fox) || 2–0 || Avilán (3–0) || Choate (1–1) || Kimbrel (30) || 48,312 || 62–39
|- style="text-align:center;" bgcolor="ffbbbb"
| 102 || July 28 || @ Braves 7:05pm (ESPN) || 5–2 || Medlen (7–10) || Miller (10–7) || Kimbrel (31) || 34,478 || 62–40
|- style="text-align:center;" bgcolor="ffbbbb"
| 103 || July 29 || @ Pirates 6:05pm || 9–2 || Liriano (11–4) || Westbrook (7–5) || || 32,084 || 62–41
|- style="text-align:center;" bgcolor="ffbbbb"
| 104 || July 30 || @ Pirates 3:05pm || 2–1 (11) || Mazzaro (6–2) || Siegrist (0–1) || || --- || 62–42
|- style="text-align:center;" bgcolor="ffbbbb"
| 105 || July 30 || @ Pirates 6:05pm || 6–0 || Cumpton (1–1) || Lyons (2–4) || || 33,861 || 62–43
|- style="text-align:center;" bgcolor="ffbbbb"
| 106 || July 31 || @ Pirates 6:05pm || 5–4 || Watson (3–1) || Rosenthal (1–2) || Melancon (5) || 31,679 || 62–44 
|-

|- style="text-align:center;" bgcolor="bbffbb"
| 107 || August 1 || @ Pirates 6:05pm || 13–0 || Kelly (2–3) || Morton (3–3) || || 31,999 || 63–44
|- style="text-align:center;" bgcolor="bbffbb"
| 108 || August 2 || @ Reds 6:10pm || 13–3 || Miller (11–7) || Arroyo (9–9) || || 39,095 || 64–44
|- style="text-align:center;" bgcolor="ffbbbb"
| 109 || August 3 || @ Reds 6:10pm || 8–3 || Cingrani (5–1) || Westbrook (7–6) || || 41,598 || 64–45 
|- style="text-align:center;" bgcolor="bbffbb"
| 110 || August 4 || @ Reds 12:10pm || 15–2 || Lynn (13–5) || Leake (10–5) || || 39,618 || 65–45
|- style="text-align:center;" bgcolor="ffbbbb"
| 111 || August 5 || Dodgers 6:15pm || 3–2 || Greinke (9–3) || Wainwright (13–7) || Rodriguez (2) || 42,464 || 65–46
|- style="text-align:center;" bgcolor="bbffbb"
| 112 || August 6 || Dodgers 7:15pm || 5–1 || Kelly (3–3) || Kershaw (10–7) || || 41,770 || 66–46
|- style="text-align:center;" bgcolor="ffbbbb"
| 113 || August 7 || Dodgers 7:15pm || 13–4 || Nolasco (8–9) || Westbrook (7–7) || || 43,523 || 66–47
|- style="text-align:center;" bgcolor="ffbbbb"
| 114 ||August 8 || Dodgers 7:15pm || 5–1 || Ryu (11–3) || Martinez (0–1) || || 42,567 || 66–48
|- style="text-align:center;" bgcolor="ffbbbb"
| 115 || August 9 || Cubs 7:15pm || 3–0 || Rusin (2–1) || Lynn (13–6) || Gregg (24) || 42,664 || 66–49
|- style="text-align:center;" bgcolor="ffbbbb"
| 116 || August 10 || Cubs 6:15pm || 6–5 || Parker (1–1) || Rosenthal (1–3) || Gregg (25) || 43,908 || 66–50
|- style="text-align:center;" bgcolor="bbffbb"
| 117 || August 11 || Cubs 1:15pm || 8–4 || Choate (2–1) || Parker (1–2) || Mujica (31) || 43,240 || 67–50 
|- style="text-align:center;" bgcolor="bbffbb"
| 118 || August 13 || Pirates 7:15pm || 4–3 (14) || Freeman (1–0) || Hughes (2–3) || || 40,243 || 68–50
|- style="text-align:center;" bgcolor="ffbbbb"
| 119 || August 14 || Pirates 7:15pm || 5–1 || Liriano (13–5) || Miller (11–8) || || 40,644 || 68–51
|- style="text-align:center;" bgcolor="bbffbb"
| 120 || August 15 || Pirates 12:45pm || 6–5 (12) || Siegrist (1–1) || Morris (5–6) || || 41,502 || 69–51
|- style="text-align:center;" bgcolor="ffbbbb"
| 121 || August 16 || @ Cubs 3:05pm || 7–0 || Arrieta (2–2) || Westbrook (7–8) || || 35,258 || 69–52
|- style="text-align:center;" bgcolor="bbffbb"
| 122 || August 17 || @ Cubs 3:05pm (Fox) || 4–0 || Kelly (4–3) || Wood (7–10) || || 41,981 || 70–52
|- style="text-align:center;" bgcolor="bbffbb"
| 123 || August 18 || @ Cubs 1:20pm || 6–1 || Wainwright (14–7) || Jackson (7–13) || || 33,830 || 71–52
|- style="text-align:center;" bgcolor="bbffbb"
| 124 || August 19 || @ Brewers 7:10pm || 8–5 || Wacha (2–0) || Kintzler (3–1) || Mujica (32) || 32,972 || 72–52
|- style="text-align:center;" bgcolor="ffbbbb"
| 125 || August 20 || @ Brewers 7:10pm || 6–3 || Lohse (9–8) || Lynn (13–7) || Henderson (19) || 38,093 || 72–53
|- style="text-align:center;" bgcolor="bbffbb"
| 126 || August 21 || @ Brewers 1:10pm || 8–6 || Siegrist (2–1) || Gorzelanny (3–5) || Mujica (33) || 37,028 || 73–53
|- style="text-align:center;" bgcolor="bbffbb"
| 127 || August 22 || Braves 7:15pm || 6–2 || Kelly (5–3) || Maholm (9–10) || || 37,363 || 74–53
|- style="text-align:center;" bgcolor="bbffbb"
| 128 || August 23 || Braves 7:15pm || 3–1 || Wainwright (15–7) || Medlen (10–12) || || 41,134 || 75–53
|- style="text-align:center;" bgcolor="bbffbb"
| 129 || August 24 || Braves 6:15pm || 6–2 || Miller (12–8) || Teherán (10–7) || Mujica (34) || 43,633 || 76–53
|- style="text-align:center;" bgcolor="ffbbbb"
| 130 || August 25 || Braves 1:15pm (TBS) || 5–2 || Minor (13–5) || Lynn (13–8) || Kimbrel (41) || 44,009 || 76–54
|- style="text-align:center;" bgcolor="bbffbb"
| 131 || August 26 || Reds 6:05pm (ESPN) || 8–6 || Martinez (1–1) || Parra (1–3) || Mujica (35) || 35,159 || 77–54
|- style="text-align:center;" bgcolor="bbffbb"
| 132 || August 27 || Reds 7:15pm || 6–1 || Kelly (6–3) || Latos (13–5) || || 35,201 || 78–54
|- style="text-align:center;" bgcolor="ffbbbb"
| 133 || August 28 || Reds 7:15pm || 10–0 || Bailey (9–10) || Wainwright (15–8) || || 35,698 || 78–55
|- style="text-align:center;" bgcolor="ffbbbb"
| 134 || August 30 || @ Pirates 6:05pm || 5–0 || Liriano (15–6) || Miller (12–9) || || 38,026 || 78–56
|- style="text-align:center;" bgcolor="ffbbbb"
| 135 || August 31 || @ Pirates 6:05pm || 7–1 || Burnett (7–9) || Lynn (13–9) || || 39,514 || 78–57
|-

|- style="text-align:center;" bgcolor="bbffbb"
| 136 || September 1 || @ Pirates 12:35pm || 7–2 || Kelly (7–3) || Johnson (0–2) || || 37,912 || 79–57
|- style="text-align:center;" bgcolor="ffbbbb"
| 137 || September 2 || @ Reds 12:10pm || 7–2 || Latos (14–5)  || Wainwright (15–9) || || 32,951 || 79–58
|- style="text-align:center;" bgcolor="ffbbbb"
| 138 || September 3 || @ Reds 6:10pm || 1–0 || Bailey (10–10) || Maness (5–2) || Chapman (34) || 20,219 || 79–59
|- style="text-align:center;" bgcolor="bbffbb"
| 139 || September 4 || @ Reds 6:10pm || 5–4 (16) || Martinez (2–1) || Ondrusek (3–1) || || 23,894 || 80–59
|- style="text-align:center;" bgcolor="ffbbbb"
| 140 || September 5 || @ Reds 6:10pm || 6–2 || Cingrani (7–3) || Lynn (13–10) || || 21,418 || 80–60
|- style="text-align:center;" bgcolor="bbffbb"
| 141 || September 6 || Pirates 7:15pm || 12–8 || Kelly (8–3) || Burnett (7–10) || Mujica (36) || 40,608 || 81–60
|- style="text-align:center;" bgcolor="bbffbb"
| 142 || September 7 || Pirates 6:15pm || 5–0 || Wainwright (16–9) || Locke (9–5) || || 45,110 || 82–60
|- style="text-align:center;" bgcolor="bbffbb"
| 143 || September 8 || Pirates 1:15pm || 9–2 || Wacha (3–0) || Morton (7–4) || || 40,156 || 83–60
|- style="text-align:center;" bgcolor="bbffbb"
| 144 || September 10 || Brewers 7:15pm || 4–2 || Miller (13–9) || Peralta (9–15) || || 35,050 || 84–60
|- style="text-align:center;" bgcolor="bbffbb"
| 145 || September 11 || Brewers 7:15pm || 5–1 || Rosenthal (2–3) || Kintzler (3–2) || || 35,134 || 85–60
|- style="text-align:center;" bgcolor="ffbbbb"
| 146 || September 12 || Brewers 7:15pm || 5–3 || Thornburg (2–1) || Kelly (8–4) || Henderson (25) || 35,208 || 85–61
|- style="text-align:center;" bgcolor="bbffbb"
| 147 || September 13 || Mariners 7:15pm || 2–1 (10) || Siegrist (3–1) || Ruffin (0–2) || || 40,506 || 86–61
|- style="text-align:center;" bgcolor="ffbbbb"
| 148 || September 14 || Mariners 6:15pm || 4–1 || Paxton (2–0) || Wacha (3–1) || Farquhar (14) || 41,374 || 86–62
|- style="text-align:center;" bgcolor="bbffbb"
| 149 || September 15 || Mariners 1:15pm || 12–2 || Miller (14–9) || Ramírez (5–2) || || 40,526 || 87–62
|- style="text-align:center;" bgcolor="ffbbbb"
| 150 || September 16 || @ Rockies 7:40pm || 6–2 || Bettis (1–3) || Rosenthal (2–4) || || 31,117 || 87–63
|- style="text-align:center;" bgcolor="bbffbb"
| 151 || September 17 || @ Rockies 7:40pm || 11–4 || Kelly (9–4) || Nicasio (8–8) || || 27,107 || 88–63
|- style="text-align:center;" bgcolor="bbffbb"
| 152 || September 18 || @ Rockies 7:40pm || 4–3 || Wainwright (17–9) || Chatwood (7–5) || Mujica (37) || 26,955 || 89–63
|- style="text-align:center;" bgcolor="ffbbbb"
| 153 || September 19 || @ Rockies 2:10pm || 7–6 (15) || Scahill (1–0) || Salas (0–3) || || 33,258 || 89–64
|- style="text-align:center;" bgcolor="bbffbb"
| 154 || September 20 || @ Brewers 7:10pm || 7–6 (10) || Axford (7–7) || Blazek (0–1) || Martinez (1) || 37,148 || 90–64
|- style="text-align:center;" bgcolor="bbffbb"
| 155 || September 21 || @ Brewers 6:10pm || 7–2 || Lynn (14–10) || Gallardo (11–10) || || 35,008 || 91–64
|- style="text-align:center;" bgcolor="ffbbbb"
| 156 || September 22 || @ Brewers 7:05pm (ESPN) || 6–4 || Peralta (11–15) || Kelly (9–5) || Henderson (26) || 27,389 || 91–65
|- style="text-align:center;" bgcolor="bbffbb"
| 157 || September 23 || Nationals 7:15pm || 4–3 || Wainwright (18–9) ||  Roark (7–1) || Rosenthal (1) || 39,783 || 92–65
|- style="text-align:center;" bgcolor="bbffbb"
| 158 || September 24 || Nationals 7:15pm || 2–0 || Wacha (4–1) ||  González (11–8) || Rosenthal (2) || 38,940 || 93–65
|- style="text-align:center;" bgcolor="bbffbb"
| 159 || September 25 || Nationals 12:45pm || 4–1 || Miller (15–9) ||  Zimmermann (19–9) || Rosenthal (3) || 40,597 || 94–65
|- style="text-align:center;" bgcolor="bbffbb"
| 160 || September 27 || Cubs 7:15pm || 7–0 || Lynn (15–10) ||  Wood (9–12) || || 44,030 || 95–65
|- style="text-align:center;" bgcolor="bbffbb"
| 161 || September 28 || Cubs 3:15pm || 6–2 || Wainwright (19–9) || Jackson (8–18) || || 42,520 || 96–65
|- style="text-align:center;" bgcolor="bbffbb"
| 162 || September 29 || Cubs 1:15pm || 4–0 || Kelly (10–5) || Samardzija (8–13) || || 44,808 || 97–65
|-

Postseason Game Log

Roster

Injury report

Injury Report

In-season acquisitions and roster moves

April
 April 8:  Optioned 2B Ryan Jackson to AAA Memphis.
 April 26:  Purchased the contract of 3B Jermaine Curtis from Memphis.
 April 29:  Optioned LHP Mark Rzepczynski to Memphis and purchased the contract of RHP Seth Maness.

May
 May 3:  Transferred Rafael Furcal to the 60-day DL.
 May 3:  Optioned RHP Mitchell Boggs to Memphis and purchased the contract of RHP Carlos Martínez, (the #2 prospect).
 May 7:  Optioned Curtis back to Memphis when the team activated first baseman Matt Adams from the 15-day DL.
 May 12:  Transferred Motte to the 60-day DL. 
 May 12:  Placed RHP Jake Westbrook on the 15-day DL and purchased the contract of LHP John Gast, (the #8 prospect), from Memphis.
 May 18:  Recalled Boggs from Memphis and placed Jaime García on the 15-day DL.
 May 19:  Purchased the contract of LHP Tyler Lyons from Memphis.
 May 21:  The Chicago Cubs claimed RHP Eduárdo Sanchéz off-waivers.
 May 22:  Activated Lyons after placing Salas on 15-day DL.
 May 26: Recalled RHP Michael Blazek, (the #9 prospect), after placing Gast on the 15-day DL.
 May 27: Recalled RHP Víctor Marte after sending Martínez back to Memphis.
 May 29:  Placed Óscar Taveras, (the #1 prospect, not on roster), on 7-day DL.
 May 30:  Purchased the contract of RHP Michael Wacha, (the #4 prospect), from Memphis.
 May 30:  Activated Wacha after transferring García to the 60-day DL and demoting Blazek to Memphis.
 May 31:  Recalled RHP Keith Butler after demoting Boggs to Memphis for the second time.

June
 June 5: Recalled RHP Maikel Cleto after demoting Víctor Marte to Memphis.
 June 6: Recalled LHP Siegrist after demoting Cleto..
 June 14: Activated RHP Westbrook from the DL after demoting Wacha to Memphis.
 June 22: Recalled RHP Blazek after demoting Lyons to Memphis.
 June 23:  The Kansas City Royals claimed Cleto off waivers.

July
 July 9:  Purchased contract of C Rob Johnson after giving INF Ty Wigginton his unconditional release.
 July 9:  Sold the contract of Mitchell Boggs to the Colorado Rockies for $206,400 in international signing bonus money. 
 July 11:  Recalled RHP Carlos Martínez and optioned RHP Michael Blazek to Memphis.
 July 20: Purchased contract of 1B Brock Peterson and placed OF Matt Holliday on 15-day DL.
 July 25: Recalled LHP Marc Rzepczynski after Carlos Martinez optioned to AAA-Memphis.
 July 27: Activated Matt Holliday and optioned Brock Peterson to Memphis.
 July 30: Recalled RHPs Blazek, Butler and LHP Lyons for one day after optioning Rzepczynski and Salas.
 July 30: Traded LHP Marc Rzepczynski to the Cleveland Indians for SS Juan Herrera.
 July 31:  Recalled 1B Brock Peterson and OF Adron Chambers and placed C Yadier Molina and OF Shane Robinson on the 15-day DL.

August
 August 9:  Recalled RHP Michael Wacha after optioning RHP Carlos Martínez.
 August 16: Brought up from AAA-Memphis #4 prospect, 2B Kolten Wong after optioning OF Adron Chambers.
 August 17: Recalled LHP Tyler Lyons after optioning LHP Sam Freeman.
 August 23:  Recalled RHP Carlos Martínez after placing Jake Westbrook on 15-day DL.
 August 27:  Recalled RHP Fernando Salas after optioning LHP Tyler Lyons to Memphis.
 August 28:  Recalled RHP Michael Blazek after optioning RHP Carlos Martínez.
 August 29:  Recalled LHP Sam Freeman after optioning RHP Michael Wacha to Springfield and RHP Michael Blazek to Memphis.
 August 30:  Acquired RHP John Axford (closer) from the Milwaukee Brewers, in exchange for a player to be named later (Michael Blazek on September 1).

September
 September 1: Recalled and placed OF Adron Chambers on the expanded 40-man roster.

October
 October 23:  Added Allen Craig to the postseason roster for the World Series roster and removed Chambers.

Regular season statistics
Note:  All statistics final through September 29, 2013

Composite scoring by inning

Batters
 Statistics notes: POS = Position; G = Games played; AB = At bats; R = Runs; H = Hits; 2B = Doubles; HR = Home runs; RBI = Runs batted in; BB = Base on balls; SO = Strikeouts; GIDP = Grounded into double plays ; AVG = Batting average; OBP = On-base percentage; SLG = Slugging percentage; OPS = On-base plus slugging
 Table notes: 
Table half above double line: Appeared in most games at that position  
Below double line: Ranked by ABs regardless of position 
Includes all player at-bats during season, excluding pitchers batting
 Bold: led or tied for lead in the National League (NL)
 [§]: Major league-leader or tied for lead
 [*]: Top-ten finisher in NL, but not league-leader
 Bold (non-italicized): led or tied for team lead

                                              

Cardinals Batting statistics, by BA   |  
NL Batting Leaders, by BA   |   Cardinals, sorted by AB  |  NL Batting Statistics by Team  |  Baseball Reference – 2013 St. Louis Cardinals

Pitchers
 Statistics notes: GP = Games pitched; GS = Games started; IP = Innings pitched; W = Wins; L = Losses; ERA = Earned run average; H = Hits allowed; HR = Home runs allowed; BB = Walks allowed; SO = Strikeouts; WHIP = Walks plus hits per inning pitched; HBP = Hit by pitch; BF = Batters faced; O-AVG = Opponent batting avg.; O-OBP = Opponent on-base avg.; O-SLG = Opponent slugging pct.;; CG = Complete games; ShO = Shutouts; SV = Save; HLD = Hold; R suppt = Run support average from his team's batters per game started Includes all pitchers for season Bold: led or tied for lead in the National League (NL)
 [§]: Major league-leader or tied for lead
 [*]: Top-ten finisher in NL, but not league-leader
 Bold (non-itlalicized): led or tied for team lead

Other starters' statistics; CG: 7, ShO: 4.
Other relief pitching statistics: 44/64 Sv/opp (69%); 335/483 first batters retired (70%); 60/267 inherited runners scored (22%).

Team pitching statistics  |  Individual pitching statistics   |  Sortable Team pitching Statistics  |  Cardinals Pitchers  |  NL Team Pitching

Fielding

NL Team Fielding 

Cardinals Record When

Percentage of scoring via home runs

Awards and honors

MLB.com Pitching Performance of the Month:  Shelby Miller (May)
National League Pitcher of the Month:  Adam Wainwright (June)
Roberto Clemente Award:  Carlos Beltrán

All-Star Game selectees

 Carlos Beltrán, RF (starter)
 Matt Carpenter, 2B
 Allen Craig, 1B
 Yadier Molina, C (starter)
 Edward Mujica, P (did not pitch)
 Adam Wainwright, P (did not pitch)

Rawlings Gold Glove Award

 Adam Wainwright (Pitcher) 
 Yadier Molina (Catcher)

Silver Slugger Award

 Yadier Molina (Catcher)
 Matt Carpenter (Second base)

Postseason

 Michael Wacha, NLCS MVPThe Sporting News National League All-Star team

 Yadier Molina, C
 Matt Carpenter, 2BBaseball America All-Rookie team

 Matt Adams, 1B
 Shelby Miller, SP 
 Trevor Rosenthal, RP

Award finalists notes

For the NL Most Valuable Player Award, Molina was third and Matt Carpenter fourth.  Other Cardinals receiving votes for MVP included Matt Holliday, Wainwright, and Craig.  Wainwright finished second to the Dodgers' Clayton Kershaw in the NL Cy Young Award award balloting.   In the NL Rookie of the Year voting, Miller slotted third behind the Marlins' José Fernández and the Dodgers' Yasiel Puig.  Mike Matheny placed fourth in the NL Manager of the Year award.  Matt Carpenter was selected as the team finalist for Heart & Hustle Award; Boston's Dustin Pedroia was the winner.  Beltrán was the Cardinals' finalist for the Marvin Miller Man of the Year Award; the New York Yankees' Mariano Rivera was declared the recipient.

Home attendance
(final through September 29) 

2013 St. Louis Cardinals
2012 St. Louis Cardinals

Post-season

National League Division Series

Game 1, October 3
5:07 p.m. (EDT) at Busch Stadium in St. Louis, Missouri

The Cardinals set a new NLDS record with seven runs in an inning (that record was broken the next year by the Cardinals, who scored 8 runs in the 7th inning of Game 1 of the 2014 NLDS)KMOX announcer John Rooney highlighted by Carlos Beltrán's towering three-run home run (443 feet), his 15th in post-season play tying Babe Ruth for eighth place on the list. Only Derek Jeter (20) and Albert Pujols (18) among active players have more.

Game 2, October 4
1:07 p.m. (EDT) at Busch Stadium in St. Louis, Missouri

Game 3, October 6
4:37 p.m. (EDT) at PNC Park in Pittsburgh, Pennsylvania

Game 4, October 7
3:07 p.m. (EDT) at PNC Park in Pittsburgh, Pennsylvania

With St. Louis just one game from elimination, rookie Michael Wacha was called upon to start the game, and he nearly duplicated his September 24 no-hit effort just two weeks earlier against the Washington Nationals by carrying a no-hitter into the eighth inning.  Again, he left having given up just one hit – Pedro Alvárez broke it up in the eighth with a home run for the Pirates' lone hit and run. Two more rookies – Carlos Martínez and Trevor Rosenthal – finished the game. With this performance, Wacha delivered a postseason no-hitter deeper than any rookie in history, surpassing Jeff Tesreau's  innings for the 1912 New York Giants. He also became the first first-round draft pick since Barry Zito (2000) to start a postseason game less than two years after being drafted. He was acquired in the 2012 draft with the 19th overall pick from the Los Angeles Angels as compensation for losing Albert Pujols Matt Holliday provided all the runs the Cardinals needed with his two-run homer in the sixth. With the Game 4 win, the Cardinals guaranteed a Game 5, making it the third straight NLDS Game 5 in as many years. Trevor Rosenthal picked up his first career post-season save.

Game 5, October 9

8:07 p.m. (EDT) at Busch Stadium in St. Louis, Missouri

Behind Adam Wainwright's arm, and a pair of two-run home runs by David Freese and Matt Adams, the Cardinals clinch their 8th trip to the National League Championship Series since 2000.

National League Championship Series

Game 1
Friday, October 11, 2013 – 8:37 p.m. (EDT) at Busch Stadium in St. Louis, Missouri

Game 2
Saturday, October 12, 2013 – 4:07 p.m. (EDT) at Busch Stadium in St. Louis, Missouri

Game 3
Monday, October 14, 2013 – 8:07 p.m. (EDT) at Dodger Stadium in Los Angeles

Game 4
Tuesday, October 15, 2013 – 8:07 p.m. (EDT) at Dodger Stadium in Los Angeles

Game 5
Wednesday, October 16, 2013 – 4:07 p.m. (EDT) at Dodger Stadium in Los Angeles

Game 6
Friday, October 18, 2013 – 8:37 p.m. (EDT) at Busch Stadium in St. Louis, Missouri

For the fourth time in 10 seasons, the Cardinals won the National League pennant.
Michael Wacha, 22, was named NLCS MVP. He became the youngest NLCS MVP Award winner since 21-year-old Steve Avery of the Braves in 1991, the first rookie to win a postseason series MVP Award since then-Marlins sensation Liván Hernández in the 1997 World Series, and the first rookie to start and win an NLCS clinching game since the Dodgers' Fernando Valenzuela in 1981.

Composite line score
2013 NLCS (4–2): St. Louis Cardinals over Los Angeles Dodgers

World Series

The Cardinals faced the American League champion Boston Red Sox, nine years after the two teams' last World Series meeting in 2004.  Billed as a "throwback series", it was the first World Series since 1999 whose contestants finished with the best record in their respective leagues – prior to the introduction of divisional play in 1969, the top regular season records in each league qualified those teams for the World Series with no other playoff rounds.

The Red Sox led the American League in runs scored with 853 giving up 656 runs, as the Cardinals were in leading the National League with 783 runs scored, while giving up only 596 runs.

Game 1
Wednesday, October 23, 2013 – 8:07 p.m. (EDT) at Fenway Park in Boston, Massachusetts

Game 2
Thursday, October 24, 2013 – 8:07 p.m. (EDT) at Fenway Park in Boston, Massachusetts

Game 3
Saturday, October 26, 2013 – 8:07 p.m. (EDT) at Busch Stadium in St. Louis, Missouri

Game 4
Sunday, October 27, 2013 – 8:15 p.m. (EDT) at Busch Stadium in St. Louis, Missouri

Game 5
Monday, October 28, 2013 – 8:07 p.m. (EDT) at Busch Stadium in St. Louis, Missouri

Game 6
Wednesday, October 30, 2013 – 8:07 p.m. (EDT) at Fenway Park in Boston, Massachusetts

Composite line score
2013 World Series (4–2): Boston Red Sox (A.L.) vs. St. Louis Cardinals (N.L.)

Executives and club officials
 Owner, chairman and CEO:  William DeWitt, Jr.
 President:  William DeWitt III
 Sr. vice president and general counsel: Mike Whittle
 Sr. vice president of baseball operations / GM:  John Mozeliak
 Assistant general manager:  Mike Girsch
 Special assistants to the GM: Ryan Franklin, Mike Jorgensen, Cal Eldred, Red Schoendienst
 Director, player personnel: Matt Slater
 Director of major league administration: Judy Carpenter-Barada
 Director of minor league operations:  John Vuch
 Baseball operations assistant, player development: Tony Ferreira
 Director, scouting:  Dan Kantrovitz
 Director, international operations:  Moisés Rodríguez
 Baseball operations assistant, international: Luis Morales
 Manager of baseball development: Christopher Correa
 Quantitative analyst: Matt Bayer, Dane Sorensen
 Director, media relations: Brian Bartow
 Director, public relations and civic affairs: Ron Watermon
 Senior medical advisor:  Barry Weinberg
 Head league trainer: Greg Hauck
 Strength/conditioning coach: Pete Prinzi
 Equipment manager: Rip Rowan
 Traveling secretary: C.J. Cherre
 Vice president and community relations and exec. director, Cardinals Care: Michael Hall
 Vice president, event services and merchandizing:  Vicki Bryant
 Sr. vice president of finance/CFO:  Brad Wood
 Vice president of stadium operations:  Joe Abernathy
 Sr. vice president of sales and marketing:  Dan Farrell

Cardinals Front Office

Minor leagues

Affiliations
2014 Minor League standings

† – Runner up for 2013 New York–Penn League championship.

Organizational and prospect analyses
ESPN's Keith Law ranked St. Louis' minor league system tops in all of baseball in a February 2013 publication.  Another publication ranked the Cardinals 7th of the 30 teams in homegrown talent.  The MLB Network ranked four Cardinals' prospects in its Top 50 list for 2013 thusly: Trevor Rosenthal #43 (21st round in 2009 draft; 2.97 ERA in 109 IP in 2012), Carlos Martínez #33, Shelby Miller #25 [was #5 in 2012], and Oscar Taveras #3, in 2012 with the Springfield Cardinals (Texas League) figures and rankings: .321 BA–1st, 37 Doubles–1st, 23 Home Runs—tied 4th, 94 RBI–2nd, .953 OPS–2nd, 83 Runs–3rd.

Baseball America ranks the Cardinals' top 10 prospects St. Louis Post-Dispatch (January 14, 2013) 
, Baseball America 2013 Prospect Watch (January 16) 
2013 Cardinals Prospect Watch, MLB.com 
Cards organization preview, Top 20 Prospects, MLB.com (February 8, 2012) 
Memphis Redbirds-AAA roster 
Springfield Cardinals-AA roster

Draft selections

 St. Louis Cardinals 2013 Draft Selections

Players from this draft who played in the major leagues

References

External links

NL Team Batting Statistics
NL Team Pitching Statistics
NL Team Fielding Statistics
St. Louis Cardinals 2013 season at Baseball Reference''
St. Louis Cardinals TEAM AUDIT at Baseball Prospectus
St. Louis Cardinals at Scout.com
2013 St. Louis Cardinals at ESPN

St. Louis Cardinals seasons
St. Louis Cardinals
St. Louis Cardinals
National League Central champion seasons
National League champion seasons